Sir Henry Dixon Kimber, 2nd Baronet (1862–1950) was one of the Kimber baronets. His father, Henry Kimber, was the first member of parliament for Wandsworth, being created a baronet in 1904 after representing the area for almost 30 years.

Kimber hoped to become Lord Mayor of London, but instead became Chief Commoner in which capacity he was responsible for the City of London's property holdings.

Kimber's son by his first marriage was killed in the First World War. His second son was Sir Charles Dixon Kimber, 3rd Baronet who inherited the title in 1950.

References 

1862 births
1950 deaths
Baronets in the Baronetage of the United Kingdom